Symphyotrichum divaricatum (formerly Symphyotrichum subulatum var. ligulatum) is an annual and herbaceous plant commonly known as southern annual saltmarsh aster. It is native to the southern United States and some northern states of Mexico.

Description
Symphyotrichum divaricatum is an annual and herbaceous plant with a tap root. Stems are green and simple, but sometimes have lower branches. Stems often have purple or brownish areas, and they are hairless. Sometimes there are small hairs where the leaves meet the stem. The hairless leaves are thin and green to dark green in color.

The species usually flowers from July through November, but sometimes into February. It has lavender to blue ray florets surrounding yellow disk florets. As the plant is drying after pollination, each ray floret curls under into three to five coils.

Distribution and habitat
Symphyotrichum divaricatum is native to the Mexican states of Baja California Sur, Chihuahua, Coahuila, and Tamaulipas, as well as the US states of Alabama, Arkansas, Kansas, Louisiana, Mississippi, Nebraska, New Mexico, Oklahoma, Tennessee, Texas, and Virginia. It has been introduced into Colombia and New York.

Taxonomy
The species' full scientific name is Symphyotrichum divaricatum (Nutt.) G.L.Nesom. , its former name, S. subulatum var. ligulatum (Shinners) S.D.Sundb., is a taxonomic synonym to this species.

Conservation
, NatureServe lists it as Secure (G5) worldwide, and Critically Imperiled (S1) in West Virginia, Apparently Secure (S4) in Nebraska, as well as exotic in Missouri. NatureServe's last review of the global status of this species was 21 December 2001.

Notes

Citations

References

divaricatum
Flora of the United States
Flora of Mexico
Plants used in traditional Native American medicine
Plants described in 1840
Taxa named by Thomas Nuttall